A Bullet in the Heart (translit. Rossassa Fel Qalb) is a 1944 Egyptian drama film directed by Mohammed Karim starring Egyptian actresses Raqiya Ibrahim, Faten Hamama, musician Mohamed Abdel Wahab and actor Seraj Munir. It is based on a novel by Tewfik El-Hakim which was depicted in the 1964 play under the same starring Salah Zulfikar.

Plot 
Mohsen is a ladies' man. He has a close friend who is a polite doctor. Mohsen meets a lady, Fifi, and falls in love with her. He later discovers that she is engaged to his friend, the doctor. Although she wants to be Mohsen's lady, not the doctor's, Mohsen abandons her—he refuses her love and remains loyal to his friend.

Cast 
 Faten Hamama as Najwah
 Mohamed Abdel Wahab as Mohsen
 Raqiya Ibrahim as Fifi
 Seraj Munir as the doctor
 Zeinat Sedki
 Samia Gamal
 Bechara Wakim
 Hassan Kamel
 Ali Al-Kassar

See also 
 Egyptian cinema
 A Bullet in the Heart (play)
 Salah Zulfikar filmography
 List of Egyptian films of 1944
 List of Egyptian films of the 1940s

References 
 Rossassa Fel Qalb, official site. Retrieved on December 4, 2006.

External links 
 

1944 films
1940s Arabic-language films
1944 drama films
Films directed by Mohammed Karim
Egyptian black-and-white films
Egyptian drama films